A soldier is a member of an armed force (usually army or land force).

Soldier may also refer to:

Geography 
 Soldier, Idaho
 Soldier, Iowa
 Soldier, Kansas
 Soldier, Kentucky
 Soldier, Pennsylvania
 Soldier Field, football stadium in Chicago, Illinois
 Soldier Key, Florida
 Soldiers Lake, Arizona
 Soldier Lakes, Nevada
 Soldier Mountain, a ski area in Idaho
 Soldier Mountains, Idaho
 Soldier Mountain, California
 Soldier River, Iowa
 Soldier Summit, Utah
 Soldier Township, Crawford County, Iowa
 Soldier Township, Jackson County, Kansas
 Soldier's Cove, Nova Scotia

People

People with the name 
Soldier (surname)
 Soldier of The Salvation Army, a Salvationist who has signed the Soldier's Covenant
 Toy Soldier (Doctor Steel fan), a fan of musician and Internet personality Doctor Steel

Role or rank
 Soldier or soldato, a low-level member of an organized crime "family"

Arts, entertainment, and media

Films 
 Soldiers (film), a 1956 Soviet drama film
 The Soldier (1982 film), a 1982 Cold War action film
 Soldier (1998 American film), a 1998 American science fiction film directed by Paul W.S. Anderson
 Soldier (1998 Indian film), a 1998 Indian thriller film
 Soldier (2009 film), a 2009 Indian film directed by Vijaya Nirmala
 The Soldier (2016 film), a 2016 Nepali film

Literature
"Soldier From Tomorrow", a 1957 short story by Harlan Ellison, also published under the title "Soldier"
 "The Soldier" (poem), a poem by Rupert Brooke, fifth in a series entitled 1914
 The Soldier, 2018 novel by Neal Asher
 The Soldier, 1960 novel by Richard P. Powell
 The Soldiers, 1776 play by Jakob Michael Reinhold Lenz

Music 
 The Soldiers, a British singing trio, soldiers in the British Army

Albums 
Soldier (album), 1980 album by Iggy Pop
The Soldiers (album), album by The Soldiers
 The Soldier (album)

Songs  
 "Soldier" (Harvey Andrews song)
 "Soldier", 1982 song by Payolas
 "Soldier" (Erykah Badu song)
 "Soldier" (Gavin DeGraw song)
 "Soldier" (Destiny's Child song)
 "Soldier" (Samantha Jade song)
 "Soldier" (Neil Young song)
 "Soldier", 2002 song by Eminem on the album The Eminem Show
 "Soldier", 2013 song by Backstreet Boys from In a World Like This
 "Soldier", a song by Spirit on their 1970 album Twelve Dreams of Dr. Sardonicus
 "Soldiers" (ABBA song)
 "Soldiers" (Ulrik Munther song)
 "Soldiers" (Drowning Pool song)
"The Soldier", by John Ireland
 "Soldier", 2019 song by Trixie Mattel from One Stone
 "Soldier", 2017 song by NEFFEX

Television 
 Soldier Soldier, 1990s British television series
 Soldiers: A History of Men in Battle, 1985 British documentary series
 The Soldiers (American TV series), 1955 NBC summer comedy series
 The Soldiers (South Korean TV series), a military-themed reality show
 "Soldier" (The Outer Limits), 1964 The Outer Limits episode written by Harlan Ellison, loosely adapted from his short story "Soldier From Tomorrow"

Other arts, entertainment, and media
 Soldier Boy, three fictional superheroes in The Boys comic book and television series
 Soldier (Team Fortress 2), one of the classes in the video game
 Soldier Magazine, of the British Army

Biology 
 Soldier (butterfly) (Danaus eresimus), American butterfly
 Soldier, a caste in eusocial insects like ants and termites
 Soldier beetle
 Soldier crab (disambiguation)
 Scarlet wrasse, New Zealand fish
 "Soldiers of the queen" or "gallant soldiers", popular names for the Galinsoga plant

Other uses 
 Soldier (party), Canadian political party
Soldier course, a complete course of brickwork laid on end vertically, with the narrow side exposed in the face of the wall
 Soldier settlement (Australia), soldiers' resettlement schemes in Australia
 Soldiers (food), thin strips of toast or bread meant to be dipped into a soft-boiled egg

See also 
 Solder
 Holy Soldier, a former Christian hard rock band
Soldat (disambiguation)
Souldier, a 2018 album by Jain
Soulja (disambiguation)